The Main Street Commercial Historic District is located in Jefferson, Wisconsin.

Description
The district is made up of Jefferson's old downtown, including the 1860 Jefferson House hotel, the 1869/1907 Neuer Saloon/Sample room, the 1884 Italianate Beinfang Block,  the 1892 Queen Anne Fisher Building, the 1896 Gothic Revival Stoppenbach Meat Market, the eclectic 1902 Jefferson County Bank, the 1911-12 Neoclassical Farmers & Merchants Bank, the 1914 Craftsman-style C&NW Depot, and the 1930 Art Deco Ziegler Garage.

References

Historic districts on the National Register of Historic Places in Wisconsin
National Register of Historic Places in Jefferson County, Wisconsin